Charlie Leslie Carter (born 25 October 1996) is an English professional footballer who plays as a midfielder for National League club Eastleigh.

Carter played for Fulham at the age of eight, before joining Woking's academy. It was at Woking where he signed his first professional contract ahead of the 2016–17 season, which would mark Carter's first season playing regular first-team football. After two full seasons at Woking, the latter in which he was the club's top goalscorer from midfield, Carter signed for Chesterfield of the National League in June 2018. He spent one season at Chesterfield before signing for League Two club Stevenage for an undisclosed fee in July 2019. Following three years at Stevenage, Carter joined Eastleigh in July 2022.

Career

Woking
Carter played at Fulham's academy at the age of eight. He joined Woking aged 16, where he was captain at various youth levels for three seasons. During the 2015–16 season, Carter spent time on loan at Chipstead. Ahead of the 2016–17 season, Carter played in a number of first-team pre-season friendlies for Woking and subsequently earned his first professional contract. He made his competitive first-team debut in a 2–2 draw away at Solihull Moors on 9 August 2016, coming on as a 79th-minute substitute for Ismail Yakubu. During his first season in the first-team, Carter made 36 appearances in all competitions as Woking finished the National League season in 18th position. Carter signed a contract extension with Woking on 15 June 2017, stating he initially found the step up to first-team football difficult, but believed with a year of experience he would be better placed for the following season.

The 2017–18 season would serve as Carter's breakthrough season in terms of his attacking output from midfield. He scored his first goal for Woking in the club's second match of the season, a 3–1 away loss at Tranmere Rovers on 8 August 2017. Carter made 46 appearances in all competitions and scored 12 times from midfield. He finished the season as the club's top goalscorer, as Woking were relegated back to the National League South after finishing in 21st place.

Chesterfield
Despite new Woking manager Alan Dowson stating he felt Carter should remain at the club for a further year to continue his development, Carter signed for National League club Chesterfield on 20 June 2018. He joined the club for an undisclosed fee, with Chesterfield having to pay compensation for the out-of-contract player as Carter was under the age of 24. Chesterfield manager Martin Allen stated he had met with Carter at Wembley Stadium during the FA Trophy final weeks prior to him signing for the club. Carter made his Chesterfield debut on the opening day of the 2018–19 season, playing the whole match in a 1–0 away victory against Ebbsfleet United. In the club's next match, he scored twice in the first-half in an eventual 3–0 triumph over Aldershot Town on 7 August 2018. He played regularly during the opening two months of the season, but suffered an ankle injury in a 1–1 draw away at Maidstone United on 29 September 2018. Carter underwent an operation on the ankle in October 2018. He returned to the first-team five months later on 23 February 2019, coming on as a 55th-minute substitute in a 1–0 defeat to Harrogate Town. Three days later, he started and scored in a 2–0 away victory at Barnet. Carter went on to play regularly through to the remainder of the season as Chesterfield finished the season in 14th position in the National League. He made 20 appearances in all competitions during a season disrupted by his ankle injury, scoring four goals.

Stevenage
Carter signed for League Two club Stevenage on 2 July 2019, joining for an undisclosed fee "after weeks of negotiations". He made his Stevenage debut in the club's 2–1 loss to Southend United at Broadhall Way on 13 August 2019, playing the opening 77 minutes of the match. Carter's first goal for the club came in a 2–1 home victory against Grimsby Town on 12 October 2019. The goal proved to be decisive in earning Stevenage their first victory of the 2019–20 season. Carter made 37 appearances during his first season with the club. He finished the season as the club's top goalscorer with six goals. Having scored four times in 23 appearances during the 2020–21 season, Carter's season was ended through injury in February 2021. He signed a new contract to remain at Stevenage on 26 May 2021. After making 20 appearances for Stevenage during the 2021–22 season, Carter was released by the club at the end of the season.

Eastleigh
Carter joined National League club Eastleigh on 4 July 2022. He was awarded the National League Player of the Month award for February 2023.

Style of play
Carter has predominantly been deployed as an attacking midfielder throughout his career. Carter states that a lot of his goals come from arriving late into the penalty area.

Career statistics

References

External links

1996 births
Living people
English footballers
Association football midfielders
Woking F.C. players
Chipstead F.C. players
Chesterfield F.C. players
Stevenage F.C. players
Eastleigh F.C. players
National League (English football) players
English Football League players